These are the season results for the 2011 RFL Championship.

Season results

Round 1

Round 2

Round 3

Round 4

Round 5

Round 6

Round 7

Round 8

Round 9

Round 10

References

RFL Championship results
2011 in French rugby league
2011 in English rugby league